Buddy Holly: Listen to Me; The Ultimate Buddy Party is a recording of the event held on September 7, 2011, to celebrate on would have been Buddy Holly's 75th birthday Buddy's birthday, while supporting fundraising for PBS.
Produced by Songmasters, with Peter Asher acting as music supervisor and producer and Waddy Wachtel as music director, the event brought together artists such as Stevie Nicks, Lyle Lovett, Raul Malo,  Patrick Stump, Chris Isaak, Graham Nash, Boz Scaggs, Michelle Branch, Shawn Colvin, Cobra Starship, Paul Anka, Phil Everly, James Burton, and Albert Lee. Others, such as Keith Richards, Ringo Starr, Jackson Browne, shared memories via video message. Buddy's widow Maria Elena Holly, seated beside Phil Everly was in attendance, singing along with every song. The event was also filmed for a PBS pledge drive special featured throughout USA during December 2011 and May/June 2012.

PBS Pledge Special Track Listing

References

External links
Official website

Buddy Holly
Tribute concerts in the United States
PBS Pledge Specials
2011 television specials